Dublin and Drogheda Railway (D&D) was a railway company in Ireland which publicly opened its 31¾ mile main line between Dublin and Drogheda in May 1844.  It was the third railway company in Ireland to operate passenger trains and the first to use the Irish standard  gauge.  It later opened branches to Howth and Oldcastle.  The opening of the Dublin and Belfast Junction Railway (D&BJct) between the D&D at Drogheda and the Ulster Railway (UR) at Portadown in 1852 saw an almost continuous main line connection between Dublin and Belfast, which was resolved by the official opening of the Boyne Viaduct in April 1855.  Amalgamations between these and other companies in 1875 and 1876 saw the creation of the Great Northern Railway of Ireland GNR(I).

Origins
In 1836 the D&D presented the scheme to parliament to construct the railway line between Dublin and Drogheda and it successfully received royal assent on 13 August 1836.  Despite support of eminent engineers for the coastal route some opposing factions pressed for an inland route via Navan and some other speculative schemes resulted in litigations, delays and expense.  Some savings in the project were possible when Rev Taylor of Ardgillan Castle near Balbriggan permitted the railway to pass through the demesne allowing the railway to take a more favourable and less expensive course.  An amended bill presented to parliament in February 1840 and assisted by the services of Daniel O'Connell and eventually passed.

John MacNeill in late 1839 as the line's engineer was ratified in May 1840. By October 1840 construction was underway.

The line was proposed to be built to  gauge on the grounds of lower costs. The two broader gauges were used nowhere else.

On 20 May 1844 Major General C. W. Pasley, the Inspector General of Railways inspected the D&D slowly in one direction and with a reverse run at speed highly commended the works and recommended to the Board of Trade they permit the line to be opened on 24 May 1844.  At this point only one track was open but the second was expected within a month or so.

The opening of the line occurred on 24 May 1844.

Initially trains ran from Drogheda (the Drogheda terminus of the D&D being 1/4 mile southeast of the current Drogheda railway station) to a temporary Dublin terminus at the Royal Canal.

Route
The following stations were served by the line when it opened:
Royal Canal (Temporary Dublin terminus - replaced by Amiens Street Station on 29 November 1844);
Clontarf;
Raheny;
Baldoyle;
Portmarnock;
Malahide;
Donabate;
Rush and Lusk;
Skerries;
Balbriggan;
Gormanston;
Laytown;
Bettystown;
Drogheda.

Howth branch
The branch had been partially opened to Sutton earlier on 30 July 1846.

Oldcastle branch
A branch from just prior to  opened to Navan on 15 February 1850; Kells on 11 June 1853; and finally opened on its full length to Oldcastle on 17 May 1863.

Dublin—Belfast main line
The Dublin to Drogheda route was to form part of the Dublin to Belfast main line.  In 1845 a new railway company, Dublin and Belfast Junction Railway (D&BJct), received royal assent for its Act to connect the D&D at Drogheda to the Ulster Railway at Portadown, therefore creating a rail link between Dublin and Belfast.   The line was completed in 1852 apart from the crossing of the Boyne.  The line became operationally complete when the first train crossed the Boyne Viaduct on 5 April 1855.

Rolling Stock
Unlike the D&KR which used a single central buffer the D&D used twin buffers mounted above the wheels.

Locomotives
By the time of the amalgamation into the GNR(I) in 1876 the D&D had locomotives numbered up to 23 which were inherited by the new company.  At that time the main line fast trains were allocated to  Nos. 13 to 16, built in 1859 to 1861 by Beyer-Peacock, with  driving wheels and 15x20in cylinders.  There was also No. 12, a  express engine from the same manufacturer in 1870 with 16x21in driving wheels, this had some likeness to three similar engines build for the D&BJct between 1866 and 1868.

Other locomotives used are noted. Grendons had built some small  locomotives that were later to converted to tank engines notably without brakes. Goods work was mainly handled by  engines, two of which were from Beyer Peacock.

The 1862 Neilson  locomotive with  driving wheels and  cylinders is described by Ahrons as being notable for having both side and saddle tanks and also for having the footplate fully enclosed.

Aftermath
The Northern Railway of Ireland was formed by a merger of the D&D with the D&BJct in 1875; which in turn was part of the merger that formed the Great Northern Railway of Ireland in 1876.

Model
The Fry Model Collection contains a model of the D&D locomotive 2-2-2T No. 8 and train.  This one-off locomotive was built for and used on the Howth branch together with  No. 3 built in 1844.

Notes

References

Sources

Further reading 
 
 

Railway companies established in 1844
Railway companies disestablished in 1875
Irish gauge railways
Great Northern Railway (Ireland)
Defunct railway companies of Ireland
Drogheda